Lateef Daumont, better known by his stage name Lateef the Truthspeaker, or mononymously as Lateef, is a hip hop artist from Oakland, California (United States). He is a member of several hip hop groups such as Latyrx, Lateef and the Chief, and the Mighty Underdogs. He was the founding member of the Solesides collective, which became Quannum Projects.

Life and career
Lateef was raised in East Oakland, where his father was security detail for the Black Panthers. His mother, a Panther medic, was a roommate and political associate of Angela Davis. He is of African American and Puerto Rican descent.

He has released several mixtapes such as Ahead of the Curve (2007), Truth Is Love (2009), and Truth at Sea (2011).

His solo debut album, Firewire, was released in 2011. It features contributions from Chief Xcel, Del the Funky Homosapien, the Grouch, Lyrics Born, Dan the Automator and DJ Shadow. He was also featured on the songs "Wonderful Night" and "That Old Pair of Jeans" by Fatboy Slim.

Discography

Albums
Lateef the Truthspeaker
 Firewire (2011)

Latyrx 
 The Album (1997)
 The Second Album (2013)

Maroons 
 Maroons:Ambush (2004)

The Mighty Underdogs 
 Droppin' Science Fiction (2008)
 The Prelude (2007)

Mixtapes
 Ahead of the Curve (2007) 
 Truth Is Love (2009) 
 Truth at Sea (2011) 
 Latyrical Madness Vol. 1 (2011)

Singles
 "The Wreckoning" (1996)

Guest appearances
 Blackalicious - "Deep in the Jungle" from Melodica (1994)
 Blackalicious - "Back to the Essence" from A2G (1999)
 Blackalicious - "If I May" and "Smithzonian Institute of Rhyme" from Nia (1999)
 Blackalicious - "4000 Miles" and "It's Going Down" from Blazing Arrow (2002)
 DJ Shadow - "Mashin' on the Motorway" from The Private Press (2002)
 Lyrics Born - "The Last Trumpet" from Later That Day (2003)
 Lifesavas - "Emerge" from Spirit in Stone (2003)
 General Elektriks - "Take You Out Tonight" from Cliquety Kliqk (2003)
 Fatboy Slim - "Wonderful Night" and "The Journey" from Palookaville (2004)
 Haiku D'Etat - "Top Qualified" from Coup de Theatre (2004)
 Freeform Five - "Losing My Control" from Strangest Things (2005)
 Lyrics Born - "The Last Trumpet (Halou Remix)" from Same !@#$ Different Day (2005)
 Blackalicious - "Side to Side" from The Craft (2005)
 DJ Shadow - "Enuff" from The Outsider (2006)
 Fatboy Slim - "That Old Pair of Jeans" and "Champion Sound" from The Greatest Hits – Why Try Harder (2006)
 DJ D-Sharp - Truth Spoken Mixtape: Volume 1 (2007)
 Kidkanevil - "5th Gear" from Problems & Solutions (2007)
 Z-Trip - "On My Side" from All Pro Soundtrack (2007)
 Stateless - "This Language" from Stateless (2007)
 Galactic - "No Way" from From the Corner to the Block (2007)
 Curumin - "Kyoto" from JapanPopShow (2008)
 The BPA - "So Fukt" from I Think We're Gonna Need a Bigger Boat (2009)
 Killa Kela - "Situation" from Amplified! (2009)
 Blundetto - "My One Girl" from Bad Bad Things (2010)
 Lyrics Born - "Pushed Aside, Pulled Apart" from As U Were (2010)
Smokey Joe & the Kid - "Strange Days" from Nasty Tricks (2013)
 Blackalicious - "Alpha and Omega" from Imani Vol. 1 (2015)

Compilation appearances
 Quannum Spectrum (1999)
 Solesides Greatest Bumps (2000)
 Red Hot + Riot: The Music and Spirit of Fela Kuti (2002)

References

External links
 Official website
 
 

Living people
American musicians of Puerto Rican descent
African-American male rappers
Hispanic and Latino American rappers
Rappers from Oakland, California
Quannum Projects artists
21st-century American rappers
21st-century American male musicians
21st-century African-American musicians
1975 births
20th-century African-American people